Le Grand Ricci (or Grand dictionnaire Ricci de la langue chinoise), published in 2001, is a highly comprehensive Chinese–French dictionary, largely focusing on historical Chinese. It takes its name from the 15th century Italian missionary Matteo Ricci.

It is composed of seven volumes of more than 1,200 pages each, identifying 13,500 characters, and about 300,000 entries of terms and expressions. It is, therefore, the largest Chinese–French dictionary yet, and probably the largest dictionary of Chinese into a Western language.

Le Grand Ricci is the most comprehensive up-to-date dictionary of Chinese into a modern Western language, and it has become widely known since its publication in 2001. Though it covers the whole history of Chinese language development, most of the dictionary deals with early and imperial period Chinese language usage.

In May 2010, the DVD version was presented for the first time at the Shanghai Museum. The Ricci dictionary is available as a paid add-on in the Pleco app for Android phones and tablets and Apple iOS.

History 
Some of the Jesuits who started the project in 1949:
 Eugène Zsámár s.j. (1904-1974) (Hungarian: Zsámár Jenő)
 Yves Raguin s.j. (1912–1998)
 Claude Larre s.j. (1919–2001)
 Jean Lefeuvre s.j. (1922–2010)

References

Connected articles 
 Ricci Institutes of the Paris Ricci Institute and of the Taipei Ricci Institute : Le Grand Dictionnaire Ricci de la langue chinoise, Paris, Desclée de Brouwer, 2001, .
 Le Grand Ricci numérique, Dictionnaire encyclopédique de la langue chinoise, sur DVD-ROM, Editions du Cerf, Paris, 2010, .
 Taipei Ricci Institute : 利氏學社 《利氏漢法辭典》, 台北, 1999, 
 Jesuit China missions
 Alexander of Rhodes

External links 
 Association Ricci pour le grand dictionnaire français de la langue chinoise

Lexicography
Chinese dictionaries
Chinese to French
Jesuit China missions